The Philippines women's national under 23 volleyball team is the national volleyball team of the Philippines. The country is ranked 28 as of January 2017. Its highest achievement was in 2015 where it placed 7th. It is governed by Larong Volleyball sa Pilipinas (LVPI) since 2015.

History
The Philippines was the host country of the first ever Asian Women's U23 Volleyball Championship held in Pasig in 2015. he tournament served as the Asian qualifiers for the 2015 FIVB Volleyball Women's U23 World Championship held in Ankara, Turkey which the top two ranked teams qualified for the world championship.

The tournament was organized by the Asian Volleyball Confederation, in association with Larong Volleyball sa Pilipinas, Inc. (LVPI), the newly formed national federation for volleyball in the Philippines. The first U-23 team of the Philippines was headed by Alyssa Valdez of Ateneo De Manila University. The team ended in 7th place out of 12 nations.

Results and fixtures

Asian Women's U23 Volleyball Championship

Current squad
This is the Philippines' official line up for the 2019 Women's Volleyball Kor Royal Cup held in Thailand.

Coaching staff 
 Head coach: Emilio Reyes Jr.
 Assistant coach(s): Cristina Salak

Team staff
 Team Manager:
Marissa Andres
 Team Utility:

Medical staff
 Team Physician:
 Physical Therapist/Trainer:
 Clarence Esteban

Pool of players

Coaching staff
 Head coach: Emilio Reyes Jr.
 Assistant coach(s): Cristina Salak  Michael Fritz Santos

Team staff
 Team Manager:
 Team Utility:

Medical staff
 Team Physician:
 Physical Therapist/Trainer:
 Clarence Esteban

Previous squad

2015 Asian U23 Women’s Volleyball Championship

Coaching staff
 Head coach:  Roger Gorayeb
 Assistant coach(s):  Anusorn Bundit Edjet Mabbayad Parley Tupaz

Team Staff
 Team Manager:Ramon Cojuangco Jr.
 Team Utility: 

Medical Staff
 Team Physician:
 Physical Therapist: Raymond Pili

See also
 Philippines women's national volleyball team

References

Volleyball in the Philippines
Women's national sports teams of the Philippines
National women's under-23 volleyball teams